Ah Via Musicom is the second studio album by guitarist Eric Johnson, released in 1990 through Capitol Records. The album reached No. 67 on the U.S. Billboard 200 and remained on that chart for 60 weeks. All four singles charted on Billboard'''s Mainstream Rock chart, with three of them being top 10 hits: "High Landrons" at No. 31, "Righteous" at No. 8, "Cliffs of Dover" at No. 5 and "Trademark" at No. 7. "Cliffs of Dover" went on to win the Award for Best Rock Instrumental Performance at the 1992 Grammys.

Overview
Several songs are dedicated to fellow guitarists: Johnson stated in a March 1990 interview with Guitar Player magazine that "Steve's Boogie" is dedicated to Austin-based pedal steel guitarist Steve Hennig, while "Song for George" is dedicated to an 80-year-old guitarist friend of his named George Washington. Furthermore, "East Wes" is dedicated to jazz guitarist Wes Montgomery, and takes its name from the 1966 album East-West by The Paul Butterfield Blues Band.

A DVD-Audio edition of Ah Via Musicom was released in 2002 through Capitol Records, but without Johnson's input. After he expressed disappointment in the sound quality and mixing, it was soon withdrawn by the label after 2500 copies were sold.Lieck, Ken (2002-06-21). "Ah, DIY DVD". The Austin Chronicle. Retrieved 2014-11-11. In an August 2005 issue of Guitar Player, he confirmed that an authorized 5.1 DVD-Audio edition of the album was in the works, but as of 2022 it has not been released.

Critical reception

Robert Taylor at AllMusic gave Ah Via Musicom 4.5 stars out of 5, saying that it has "reached near-classic proportions within the guitar community" and highlighting the varied styles present, namely rock, pop, blues, country and jazz. Praise was given to Johnson for his "excellent chops and a clear tone" as well as his singing, which was described as "not quite as interesting as his guitar playing", but also for being "not obtrusive and ... at times quite pleasing".

"Cliffs of Dover" has endured as Johnson's best-known song and is a mainstay at his concerts. It was ranked No. 17 in a list of "100 Greatest Guitar Solos" by Guitar World magazine, No. 34 in a list of "50 greatest guitar tones of all time" by Guitarist'' magazine, and remains a highly regarded staple within the guitar community.

Track listing

Personnel

Eric Johnson – lead vocals (tracks 3, 4, 7, 10), guitar, piano, electric sitar, arrangement, engineering, production
Jody Lazo – vocals (tracks 7, 10)
Steven Hennig – guitar (track 5)
Steve Barber – keyboard, synthesizer, arrangement
Tommy Taylor – drums (tracks 1–7, 9–11), percussion (tracks 4, 7, 10), arrangement
Paul Bissell – percussion (track 1)
James Fenner – percussion (tracks 10, 11)
Roscoe Beck – bass (tracks 1, 3, 7, 9, 10), arrangement
Kyle Brock – bass (tracks 2–6, 11), arrangement
Reggie Witty – bass (track 7), arrangement
Wee Willie – harmonica (track 9)
Vince Mariani – arrangement
Richard Mullen – engineering, mixing (tracks 4, 7, 8, 10)
Chet Himes – engineering
Bob Lacivita – engineering
Walter New – engineering
Dave Parks – engineering
Stuart Sullivan – engineering
Michael Frondelli – mixing (except tracks 4, 8, 10)
Bernie Grundman – mastering

Chart performance

Album

Certifications

Singles

Awards

References

External links
In Review: Eric Johnson "Ah Via Musicom" at Guitar Nine Records

Eric Johnson albums
1990 albums
Capitol Records albums